Carrion is the decaying flesh of dead animals, including human flesh.

Overview
Carrion is an important food source for large carnivores and omnivores in most ecosystems. Examples of carrion-eaters (or scavengers) include crows,  vultures, condors, hawks, eagles, hyenas, Virginia opossum, Tasmanian devils, coyotes and Komodo dragons. Many invertebrates, such as the carrion and burying beetles, as well as maggots of calliphorid flies (such as one of the most important species in Calliphora vomitoria) and flesh-flies, also eat carrion, playing an important role in recycling nitrogen and carbon in animal remains.

Carrion begins to decay at the moment of the animal's death, and it will increasingly attract insects and breed bacteria. Not long after the animal has died, its body will begin to exude a foul odor caused by the presence of bacteria and the emission of cadaverine and putrescine.

Some plants and fungi smell like decomposing carrion and attract insects that aid in reproduction. Plants that exhibit this behavior are known as carrion flowers. Stinkhorn mushrooms are examples of fungi with this characteristic.

Sometimes carrion is used to describe an infected carcass that is diseased and should not be touched. An example of carrion being used to describe dead and rotting bodies in literature may be found in William Shakespeare's play Julius Caesar (III.i):

Cry 'Havoc,' and let slip the dogs of war;
That this foul deed shall smell above the earth
With carrion men, groaning for burial.

Another example can be found in Daniel Defoe's Robinson Crusoe when the title character kills an unknown bird for food but finds "its flesh was carrion, and fit for nothing".

Consumption by humans

In Noahide law

The thirty-count laws of Ulla (Talmudist) include the prohibition of humans consuming carrion. This count is in addition to the standard seven law count and has been recently published from the Judeo-Arabic writing of Shmuel ben Hophni Gaon after having been lost for centuries.

References

Zoology
Ecology
Animal death
Articles containing video clips